Alexander Kutuzov (born November 23, 1985) is a Russian professional ice hockey defenceman who is currently an unrestricted free agent. He most recently played under contract for HC Spartak Moscow of the Kontinental Hockey League (KHL).

Playing career
Kutuzov began his career with THK Tver in 2002 who later became HC MVD in 2004. In 2008 he moved to HC Neftekhimik Nizhnekamsk but after four games he moved to Sibir Novosibirsk. He remained until January 13, 2012 when he moved to HC Dynamo Moscow and eventually won the Gagarin Cup. In June 2012 Kutuzov moved back to Sibir Novosibirsk. On May 16, 2014 it became known that Kutuzov was signed by Salavat Yulaev Ufa for the 2014–15 and 2015–16 KHL seasons.

On April 28, 2018, Kutuzov agreed to a one-year contract extension to return for a second season with Lokomotiv Yaroslavl in 2018–19.

International play

While playing for the Russia men's national ice hockey team at the 2014 IIHF World Championship, Kutuzov scored his first goal for the team in his career during the quarterfinals against France, spurring a wave of jokes among Russian fans and media due to parallels with Field Marshal Kutuzov, commander-in-chief of the Russian Army, that defeated French Grande Armée of Napoleon in the war of 1812.

For winning the 2014 IIHF World Championship, Alexander Kutuzov was awarded the Order of Honour on May 27, 2014.

References

External links

1985 births
Living people
HC CSKA Moscow players
HC Dynamo Moscow players
HC Khimik Voskresensk players
Lokomotiv Yaroslavl players
HC MVD players
HC Neftekhimik Nizhnekamsk players
HC Sibir Novosibirsk players
HC Spartak Moscow players
Sportspeople from Tver
Russian ice hockey defencemen